Jacob Bobenmoyer (born May 28, 1997) is an American football long snapper for the Las Vegas Raiders of the National Football League (NFL). He played college football at Northern Colorado.

High school and college career 
Bobenmoyer attended Cheyenne East High School in Cheyenne, Wyoming, where he played tight end and linebacker. After suffering a foot injury in high school, Bobenmoyer practiced long snapping drills in place of workouts. At Northern Colorado, he played linebacker in addition to long snapper. He won the starting long snapper job at Northern Colorado as a freshman after he told his friend that he could snap better than the Bears starter and the friend told the coaches that "Jacob Bobenmoyer could snap". He was named to Phil Steele's FCS All-American team in 2018 as a long snapper.

Professional career

Denver Broncos
After going undrafted in the 2019 NFL Draft, Bobenmoyer accepted an invitation to the Denver Broncos rookie minicamp. Competing with Casey Kreiter, he was unable to win the long snapping job and was released before the start of the 2019 season. Bobenmoyer re-signed with the Broncos on March 11, 2020.

In Week 5 of the 2022 season, Bobenmoyer suffered a hand/wrist injury and was placed on injured reserve on October 10, 2022. He was activated on November 19.

Las Vegas Raiders
On March 17, 2023, Bobenmoyer signed with the Las Vegas Raiders.

References

External links 
Denver Broncos bio
Northern Colorado Bears bio

1997 births
Living people
Sportspeople from Cheyenne, Wyoming
American football long snappers
Northern Colorado Bears football players
Denver Broncos players
Players of American football from Wyoming
Las Vegas Raiders players